Vicente Macanan Navarra (born 22 January 1939) is the Bishop Emeritus of Bacolod since the appointment of Bishop Patricio A. Buzon as his successor. He served the Diocese of Bacolod from 24 May 2001 until 24 May 2016.

Early life 
Navarra was born on 22 January 1939, in Mambusao, Capiz, the youngest of four children of Doroteo Navarra and Virginia Macanan.

Ministry 
He was ordained a priest on 7 April 1962.

On 13 April 1979, Pope John Paul II appointed him Auxiliary Bishop of Capiz and Titular bishop of Velefi. He was consecrated on 26 June of the same year by the Archbishop of Capiz, Antonio José Frondosa.

He was appointed as the first bishop of the newly established Diocese of Kabankalan on 21 November 1987. On 24 May 2001, he was transferred to the see of the Diocese of Bacolod.

Pope Francis accepted his resignation on 24 May 2016 after reaching the mandatory age of 75.

References

External links

21st-century Roman Catholic bishops in the Philippines
1939 births
Living people